Cardiff Brothers Airport  was an airport located in unincorporated Fort Bend County, Texas, United States, east of the city of Fulshear and south of the city of Katy.

The airport was owned by "Cardiff Brothers" of Katy, Texas. The manager was Hal V. Cardiff.

References

External links 

Airports in Texas
Airports in Greater Houston
Buildings and structures in Fort Bend County, Texas
Transportation in Fort Bend County, Texas
Defunct airports in Texas